Walton-on-Thames Cemetery is the municipal part of Walton-on-Thames's main cemeteries next to the (Anglican) parish church and facing the Methodist Church.

Among the 229 graves are 33 for casualties from World War I and World War II. Near the entrance is a memorial wall listing 19 men who served with the New Zealand Expeditionary Force in the former. Some or all of these were patients at the No. 2 New Zealand General Hospital nearby.

Notable burials 

 George Virtue (1794–1868); 19th-century London publisher, notably of engravings; has a surmounting sculpture by Joseph Edwards.
 Fred Atkins (1859–1881); police constable whose murder on Kingston Hill remains unsolved.

Gallery

References

External links 

 Official website
 The Commonwealth War Graves Commission
 

Cemeteries in Surrey
Commonwealth War Graves Commission cemeteries in England
Borough of Elmbridge